Ilmenau can refer to:

 Ilmenau, a town in the Ilm-Kreis, Thuringia, Germany
 Ilmenau (river), a tributary of the Elbe in Lower Saxony, Germany.
 Ilmenau, Lower Saxony, a municipality in the district of Lüneburg, Lower Saxony, Germany.
 German name of Jordanów
 German name of Limanowa